Les Dissonances (The Dissonances) is a European classical music orchestra created in 2004 by the violinist David Grimal. Gathering French and European musicians, the orchestra is composed of international soloists, musicians from prestigious orchestras and young talents.

Since 2008, Les Dissonances are in residence at the Opéra de Dijon.

Presentation 

The collective was created on David Grimal's initiative in 2004.

The orchestra plays works of the symphonic repertoire self conducted,  and varies in size according to the requirements of the repertoire, having an absolute freedom of interpretation.

Its repertoire includes most of the classical works  (Mozart, Beethoven, Schubert, Brahms, Vivaldi) as well as modern and contemporary repertoire (Schoenberg, Dutilleux, Ligeti...).

The members of the Les Dissonances quartet are David Grimal (violin), Hans Peter Hofmann (violin), David Gaillard (viola) and Xavier Phillips (cello).

In order to develop youngest knowledge to classical music, Les Dissonances also leads educational projects as Violin workshops in schools (P' titssonances - Little Dissonances), educational concerts or open rehearsals.

L'Autre Saison 
The ensemble Les Dissonances also leads a social project dedicated to homeless people called « The other season”. Once a month, on the grounds of the parisian Church of Église Saint-Leu, Les Dissonances invites artists, from different fields (musicians, singers, dancers, narrators, comedians) to take part of a charity concert on behalf of persons in precarious situation. Receipts help the association Les Margéniaux, to finance emergency or middle term projects.

Residence and support
Les Dissonances is supported by the French Ministry of Arts and Communications and is a member of the FEVIS (French Federation of Vocal and instrumental Specialized ensembles). It is in residence at the Dijon’s Opera since 2008, and occurs regularly at Cité de la musique in Paris, at Volcan in Le Havre and at l'Onde in Vélizy.

Discography 

 Brahms - Violin Concerto and Symphony n°4 │ Dissonances Records, March 2014
 Beethoven - Symphony n°5 │ Label Aparté, October 2011
 Vivaldi, Piazzolla – ‘’The Four Seasons’’│ Label Aparté, January 2011
 Beethoven - Violin Concerto and Symphony n°7 │ Label Aparté, October 2010
 Schoenberg and Strauss – ‘’Metamorphoses’’ │ Label Naïve Classique - Ambroisie, January 2007

See also
 David Grimal, Founder and artistic director

Notes and references

External links
Les Dissonances Official Website

French classical music groups
Musical groups established in 2004